TasWater is Tasmania's water and sewage utility. It is responsible for providing drinking water across the state as well as collecting and treating sewage. It is owned by Tasmania's 29 local governments.

TasWater commenced operations on 1 July 2013, following the merger of the three former regional Tasmanian water and sewerage corporations (Ben Lomond Water, Cradle Mountain Water and Southern Water) and the common services provider company, Onstream.

Background 

Prior to 2008, Tasmania's water and sewerage infrastructure was owned by either one of the state's 29 local government councils or one of the three bulk water authorities; Hobart Water, Esk Water and Cradle Coast Water. In 2006 a State Government appointed Ministerial Water and Sewerage Taskforce "...noted that Tasmania faced significant challenges to enable its water and sewerage infrastructure to keep pace with demand and that in many areas existing water and sewerage infrastructure was reaching capacity." The taskforce also noted that 33 towns had been identified with water supply problems and 58 wastewater treatment systems were operating below standards.

In 2008, the State Government passed the Water and Sewerage Corporations Act 2008 as a result of a report from the Taskforce. The Act transferred council owned water and sewage assets to three new entities: Southern Water, Ben Lomond Water and Cradle Mountain Water. A fourth entity, known as Onstream, provided shared services to the corporations including payroll, billing and procurement. The state's 29 Local Government councils became joint owners of the corporations with Onstream being jointly owned by the three corporations. These changes took place in July 2009.

In September 2011, the common chair of the boards of the three corporations and Onstream started talks on creating a single statewide water and sewerage corporation. In 2012 a House of Assembly Select Committee report into the issue supported the creation of a single entity. The report's executive summary found "after considering the evidence presented to it, the Committee accepts that a single entity will deliver material benefits to the Tasmanian community. These benefits will manifest as either, downward pressure on future price increases, better health outcomes as a result of increased investment in infrastructure, improved financial security for owner councils, or a combination of all three."

On July 1, 2013, the four entities were merged into the one corporation trading as Tasmanian Water and Sewerage Corporation.

Controversy
Since TasWater's creation, it has been accused of overspending, bureaucracy, causing spiralling water price increases and decreasing the quality of Tasmanian water. It has had ongoing disputes with unions, who have criticised it for spending over 1 million to hire outside consultants to investigate a staff member violently running over a duck, spending AU$280,000 to hire a recruitment agency to conduct 100 interviews, and spending $450,000 on advisers to create a new corporate structure for the company. Extensive use of outside consultants led to a number of senior employees applying for a hearing with the Fair Work Commission in June 2014 leading to union negotiations that broke down in August that year.

The company was criticised for a sewage spill into the South Esk River in April 2014, which it failed to inform the Northern Midlands Council of until three days after it was reported by residents and would not inform the Mayor of when the spill had started.

The company was the subject of a petition by residents of Circular Head Council, requesting control of local water services be returned to the council. The petition was handed to TasWater by local alderman upon receiving 350 signatures. Residents of Gretna presented a petition to Will Hodgman, the then Premier of Tasmania in January 2015, demanding fixing of their water which had been dangerous for up to six years but degenerated even further recently. Gretna was at the time one of 21 towns in Tasmania with permanent danger warnings on their water supply.

In February 2015, the state peak body for property investors, the Property Council of Australia – Tasmania branch, launched a call for the fixing of major water quality issues by paying less dividends to councils and returning profit to the companies maintenance.

See also

 List of Tasmanian government agencies

References

Government-owned companies of Tasmania
Water management in Tasmania